Lecithocera gozmanyi is a moth in the family Lecithoceridae. It was described by Pathania and Rose in 2004. It is found in India (Dehradun, Punjab).

References

Moths described in 2004
gozmanyi